Jan Keizer may refer to:
 Jan Keizer (referee) (born 1940), retired Dutch referee
 Jan Keizer (singer) (born 1949), Dutch singer and composer